Panbabylonism (also known as Panbabylonianism) was the school of thought that considered the cultures and religions of the Middle East and civilization in general to be ultimately derived from Babylonian myths which in turn they viewed as being based on Babylonian astronomy, often in hidden ways.

Overview

A related school of thought is the Bible-Babel school, which regarded the Hebrew Bible and Judaism to be directly derived from Mesopotamian (Babylonian) mythology; both are forms of hyperdiffusionism in archaeology.

Both theories were popular in Germany, and Panbabylonism remained popular from the late 19th century to World War I. Prominent advocates included Friedrich Delitzsch, Peter Jensen, Alfred Jeremias and Hugo Winckler.

Panbabylonist thought largely disappeared from legitimate scholarship after the death of one of its greatest proponents, Hugo Winckler. The claims of the school were largely discredited by astronomical and chronological arguments of Franz Xaver Kugler (a Jesuit priest).

See also

Astrotheology
Ancient Semitic religion
Christianity and Paganism
Comparative mythology
Comparative religion
Mesopotamian religion
Sumerian King Alulim as biblical Adam
The Two Babylons

References

Further reading

Anonymous. (1912). Some Recent Books on Panbabylonism. Studies: An Irish Quarterly Review 1 (3): 563–578.
G. H. Richardson. (1916). The Abuse of Biblical Archaeology. The Biblical World 47 (2): 94–99.
Bill T. Arnold and David B. Weisberg. (2002). "A Centennial Review of Friedrich Delitzsch's "Babel und Bibel" Lectures." Journal of Biblical Literature 121/3: 441–57.

External links
Panbabylonism. New Catholic Encyclopedia, 2003.
The Development, Heyday, and Demise of Panbabylonism by Gary D. Thompson.

Assyriology
Babylonia
Biblical criticism
Comparative mythology
Judaism and other religions
Mesopotamian mythology
Fringe theories
Obsolete scientific theories
Hyperdiffusionism